Reithrodontomys is the genus of groove-toothed New World harvest mice.

Species
This genus contains these species:
Baker's small-toothed harvest mouse, Reithrodontomys bakeri
Short-nosed harvest mouse, Reithrodontomys brevirostris
Sonoran harvest mouse, Reithrodontomys burti
Volcano harvest mouse, Reithrodontomys chrysopsis
Chiriqui harvest mouse, Reithrodontomys creper
Darien harvest mouse, Reithrodontomys darienensis
Fulvous harvest mouse, Reithrodontomys fulvescens
Slender harvest mouse, Reithrodontomys gracilis
Hairy harvest mouse, Reithrodontomys hirsutus
Eastern harvest mouse, Reithrodontomys humulis
Western harvest mouse, Reithrodontomys megalotis
Mexican harvest mouse, Reithrodontomys mexicanus
Small-toothed harvest mouse, Reithrodontomys microdon
Plains harvest mouse, Reithrodontomys montanus
Small harvest mouse, Reithrodontomys musseri
Nicaraguan harvest mouse, Reithrodontomys paradoxus
Salt marsh harvest mouse, Reithrodontomys raviventris
Rodriguez's harvest mouse, Reithrodontomys rodriguezi
Cozumel harvest mouse, Reithrodontomys spectabilis
Sumichrast's harvest mouse, Reithrodontomys sumichrasti
Narrow-nosed harvest mouse, Reithrodontomys tenuirostris
Zacatecas harvest mouse, Reithrodontomys zacatecae

References

Musser, G. G. and M. D. Carleton. 1993. Family Muridae.  pp. 501–755 in Mammal Species of the World a Taxonomic and Geographic Reference. D. E. Wilson and D. M. Reeder eds. Smithsonian Institution Press, Washington D.C.  Accessed 3 April 2007.

 
Rodent genera
Taxa named by Enrico Hillyer Giglioli